Auriel Andrew  (1947 – 2 January 2017) was an award-winning Arrernte country musician from the Northern Territory of Australia.

Biography 
Andrew was born in Darwin, and grew up in Mparntwe, Northern Territory. She is Arrernte, the Traditional Owners of Mparntwe and surrounding areas in Central Australia. Her skin name was Mbitjana and her totem is the hairy caterpillar (Ayepe-arenye). The youngest of seven children, she started singing at the age of four, and began her professional career by moving to Adelaide, South Australia aged 21 to pursue her music career. She worked with Chad Morgan in the Adelaide and Port Lincoln areas, and appeared on live TV music broadcasts, including shows hosted by Roger Cardwell, Johnny Mack and Ernie Sigley, and then becoming a regular on Channel Nine's Heather McKean & Reg Lindsay Show. In 1973, she moved to Sydney, and toured with Jimmy Little, performing at popular clubs and pubs around New South Wales.

Career 
In the 1970s, Andrew was a regular guest on The Johnny Mac Show, The Reg Lindsay Country Hour'''' and The Ernie Sigley Show. Her first album Truck Driving Woman (1970) was the second by an Indigenous woman in Australia.

She performed at the Sydney Opera House for the venue's grand opening, and sang "Amazing Grace" in Pitjantjitjara for Pope John Paul II during his Australian tour. Auriel's well-known recordings include the country classic "Truck Drivin' Woman" and Bob Randell's "Brown Skin Baby". She performed at the Adelaide Cabaret Festival, Woodford Dreaming Festival, and regularly performed at various clubs around the Newcastle area.

She appeared in the SBS documentary Buried Country: The Story of Aboriginal Country Music (2000) about Aboriginal country music (associated with the book by Clinton Walker), singing "Truck Driving Woman".

Other film appearances included the short films BeDevi and Hush.

Andrew appeared in the stage show Sorry Seems To Be The Hardest Word, written and performed by English artist Christopher Green at the Adelaide Cabaret Festival in 2007, and at the Beckett Theatre in Melbourne in 2011.  She also appeared on several Australian television programs including episodes of A Country Practice, Blue Heelers, Playschool and the mini-series Heartland.

Her 2013 album Ghost Gums included new original songs about her life and childhood.

She has taught Aboriginal culture in classrooms for 20 years, passing on her knowledge in schools in Queensland, the Northern Territory and New South Wales, and in 2016 joined the cast of the stage adaptation of Clinton Walker's Buried Country, which made its premiere in her hometown of Newcastle on 20 August.

 Awards and honours 
At the Deadly Awards 2008, Auriel was presented a Lifetime Achievement Award for contribution to Aboriginal & Torres Strait Islander music.

In 2011, she was awarded the Order of Australia Medal (OAM) for her work as an entertainer and contribution to her communities through charity events.

 Death 

Auriel Andrew died of cancer in Hunter Valley Private Hospital, Shortland, New South Wales, on 2 January 2017. She was 69 years old.

 Discography 

 Albums 
 Truck Driving Woman (EP) (1970)
 Just For You (Nationwide, 1971)
 Chocolate Princess (Opal Records, 1982)
 Mbitjana (Imparja, 1985)
 Ghost Gums'' (2013)

Awards 
1991 Tamworth Hands Of Fame
2005 NT Indigenous Music Awards: inducted into the hall of fame
2008 The Deadlys: Jimmy Little Lifetime Achievement Award for Contribution to Aboriginal & Torres Strait Islander Music
Order of Australia Medal 2011 (Hunter Region) for contribution to art, music and education.

References

External links 

1947 births
2017 deaths
Australian country singers
Australian women singers
Recipients of the Medal of the Order of Australia
Indigenous Australian musicians
Arrernte people